Scott Cameron may refer to:

Scott Cameron (cricketer) (born 1996), Scottish cricketer
Scott Cameron (swimmer) (born 1976), Olympic swimmer from New Zealand
Scotty Cameron (born 1962), American golf club maker 
Scotty Cameron (ice hockey) (1921–1993), Canadian ice hockey player
Scott Frederick Cameron, Canadian Surgeon General